Ghost is a fictional character appearing in American comic books published by Marvel Comics. Created by David Michelinie and Bob Layton, the character first appeared in Iron Man #219 (June 1987). Ghost is a genius inventor and hacker who wears a battle suit that allows him to become invisible and intangible. Although he started out as an adversary of the superhero Iron Man, Ghost has also been depicted as an antihero and member of the Thunderbolts.

The character has been substantially adapted from the comics into various forms of media, including animated television series and video games. Hannah John-Kamen portrays a female adaptation of Ghost named Ava Starr in the Marvel Cinematic Universe film Ant-Man and the Wasp (2018), whose powers instead stem from a failed attempt to replicate Hank Pym's quantum technology. John-Kamen will reprise the role in the upcoming film Thunderbolts (2024).

Publication history

Created by David Michelinie and Bob Layton, the character first appeared in Iron Man #219 (June 1987). Originally a supervillain to Iron Man, Ghost has since become an anti-hero figure after becoming a member of the Thunderbolts during the events of "Dark Reign" and "Heroic Age".

Fictional character biography
Very little is known about the identity of the Ghost. He claims to have been an IT researcher at one time, and to have been made into what he is by corporate greed. The Ghost is an anticapitalist saboteur who seeks to destroy various political and economic institutions he views as oppressive, apparently being most interested in those dealing with advanced technology and surveillance. He has, at times, hired his services out to corporations and other organizations, such as Norman Osborn's Thunderbolts, that wish to destroy rival groups, but invariably plans to turn on his own employers and topple them as well.

Origin
As the Ghost told Moonstone, he once worked as a programmer and an engineer at a rising IT company called Omnisapient. Impressing the board of directors with his technological prowess and genius intellect, he quickly rose up the ranks and assumed the company's flagship project for which he developed a revolutionary processor that could physically change in reaction to its environment, becoming intangible before it can overheat. Thanks to his Ghost Tech, the company's stock skyrocketed while the board, ever more dependent on the man who would become Ghost, collected the credit. Exhausted after months of work, the socially introverted programmer decided to leave on vacation, conflicting with the board of directors' expectations for an ahead-of-schedule launch that could increase their profit margins significantly. Approached by an attractive co-worker as he was about to leave, the young man cancelled his travel plans and began a relationship with her. Happier and more productive than ever, he now found every single aspect of his life tied to the company, all part of a well-oiled machine, until his lover died in an explosion at her apartment. Depressed over her death and unable to cope with its apparent randomness, he sought solace by immersing his consciousness into the data networks he created by wiring his own flesh with his flux-state processors. Within this network, no randomness existed and his unconscious mind, in a state of alpha, could solve any dilemma his conscious mind was unable or unwilling to. In this state, he pieced memories and hidden fragments of data together to realize his dead lover had been hired by the board to seduce him, keeping him happy and available to the company's every demand, and later murdered for blackmailing them for more money. Terrified, he attempted to flee, but his discoveries had been detected by the board of directors which dispatched a contract killer after him. The hitman detonated a bomb in his apartment before he could leave, destroying the entire building and killing dozens of tenants. However, he survived, made intangible by the flux-state processors fused with his body when a wall of fire hit him. The experience completed his psychological transformation and the once naive workaholic emerged as the Ghost, a paranoid vigilante bent on wiping out corporatocracy. He took revenge upon the board of directors, butchering them, along with their contract killer, and then erased all records of his previous life.

The Accutech Merger
Sometime after this, Ghost was hired by Carrington Pax, a leading executive of the Roxxon Oil Corporation, to destroy Accutech Research and Development. Accutech was trying to develop a beta particle generator and when they refused to sell it to Roxxon, the Ghost was hired to drive Accutech into bankruptcy. Tony Stark was interested in acquiring Accutech's technology and bought the company. Investigating a disturbance at the new facility as Iron Man, he first met the Ghost. Iron Man managed to drive the Ghost from Accutech, but the Ghost swore that he would have his revenge on Iron Man's employer, Tony Stark.

For the next few weeks, Tony Stark spent all his free time modifying his armor. Sometimes, for extra security, he would sleep in his armor, too. When Pax and the other executives at Roxxon heard that the Ghost had gone rogue, they feared his actions would make the company look bad, so they called in Spymaster to take care of him. After a fierce battle at Stark Enterprises, the Ghost killed Spymaster. Using a modified version of his intangibility circuits, the Ghost made Spymaster materialize in a wall. The shock caused Spymaster's whole body to shut down, and he was believed dead. It was shown years later in Dark Reign that the Spymaster had faked his death.

Tony finally took the offensive against the Ghost. He set up a trap and the Ghost walked right into it. After a short battle between Iron Man and the Ghost, Iron Man cornered the Ghost in the room with the beta particle generator. He had it turned on so he could see the cloaked Ghost better, since radiation from the generator would cause interference in the Ghost's sophisticated tech-suit. However, prolonged exposure to the generator was fatal, and Iron Man didn't want to stay in the room for too long. But the Ghost had sworn to bring down Stark Enterprises and nothing, not even the chance of dying, would stop him. As he tried to reach the generator to destroy it, the intense heat from his overloading costume caused the floor to melt and the Ghost fell through. As Iron Man searched for him, all he found of the Ghost was his burnt costume. Still, Tony didn't believe that the Ghost was dead.

Unholy Ghost
Indeed, fairly soon after, the Ghost reappeared — this time plaguing a company in Italy, owned by none other than Justin Hammer. The shrewd industrialist intended to sell the company, Electronica Fabbrizi, to Tony Stark, ridding him of a dangerous enemy and a useless asset, as well as sticking a business rival with a nasty problem. However, after Tony Stark discovered the true ownership of the floundering company, a compromise was reached: Hammer's forces and Iron Man would cooperate in taking out the Ghost. Hammer sent his operatives Blacklash, Blizzard, and Boomerang to help Iron Man fight the Ghost. However, Hammer's team betrayed Iron Man, planning to get rid of both their enemies.

Ghost attempted to kill Iron Man by rendering him intangible. While Iron Man managed to save the lives of everybody involved, Electronica Fabbrizi was irrevocably destroyed and the Ghost escaped. However, when the mysterious villain confronted Hammer, it was revealed the ruthless business man had defenses developed against the Ghost's intangibility powers, and made his own escape, leaving his assailant trapped. Blasting his way out, the saboteur vowed to continue his crusade against Hammer and all companies anywhere.

Ghost was next hired by the Kingpin to steal the new Roxxon process to create synthetic vibranium, and battled Spider-Man and the Black Panther.

The Ghost was then defeated by Sunturion, but escaped and was then defeated by Ultron.

The Big Bang Theory
Much later, several companies were suddenly and violently destroyed when bombs, apparently installed in personal computers, went off in inner-city offices. Tony Stark, who at the time was undercover as a common employee at one of the companies that went under, managed to track down the source of the attacks: the "Advanced Corp", a cover for AIM. It was then revealed that AIM, not usually operating in common business circles, on this occasion had employed a special agent to eliminate the competition: the Ghost. Nearly defeating Iron Man in their first fight and escaping without a hitch, he hit a nasty snag during their second fight when he attempted to phase his costumed hand into Iron Man's chest, and Tony Stark's then-artificial heart defended itself, knocking him unconscious. He was subsequently arrested, but his identity appears to have remained unknown.

Inevitable
Later still, having apparently escaped, the Ghost (in a new, more streamlined outfit) was employed by the third Spymaster to help free the Living Laser, who was "held captive" by Stark Industries at the time. He attempted to kill Iron Man, and believed to have succeeded. In the end, he proved too unreliable and quirky, and was abandoned by his employer, remaining at large.

The Ghost was mentioned by Gauntlet as the one who attacked him and left a NW mark on him (when it was actually the seemingly light-hearted recruit Slapstick).

"Dark Reign"

During the "Dark Reign" storyline, Ghost seems to have become more unhinged and reclusive; however, as Ms. Marvel mentions "He smells... Badly." And The Ghost himself shows signs of increasing obsessiveness.  With the Thunderbolts officially disbanded, Norman Osborn recruits Ghost for his new Thunderbolts, now a black ops team under Osborn's direct control.

Ghost helps Osborn take control of Air Force One with the Goblin (actually new Thunderbolts member Headsman), Doc Samson, and the new president aboard. As part of Osborn's plan, the Ghost phases Samson out of the plane, and drops him from the sky. Osborn calls for the Ghost to come to Stark Tower, where he unlocks a vault containing Iron Man's old armors. Ghost later reveals to the Black Widow (actually Natasha Romanoff in disguise) that when Osborn is king of the corporate world, he'll act as "a virus" to bring it down from the inside. He explains he wants to inform Yelena's real boss, Nick Fury. Widow was eventually exposed as Natalia Romanova, who was in fact Nick Fury's undercover agent, and who was attempting to make sure Songbird stayed alive. Paladin, Ghost and Headsman purposely turned on the other Thunderbolts in order for the two heroines to escape. However, Ghost insisted that they stay in the Thunderbolts, for they all have their own agendas. He uses electro-convulsive shock in order to make Scourge and Mister X forget about the betrayal. At the end of the Dark Reign arc, Ghost betrayed Osborn by sending a data package he had collected to whatever heroes could receive it, warning them of Osborn's plans to capture Odin's magical weapon, Gungnir. Aware of the emergency, Quicksilver crossed the Atlantic Ocean and crushed Mister X (who wielded the weapon at the time) in combat, retrieving it.

"Stark Disassembled"
Because Tony Stark had purposely lobotomized himself into a vegetative state, and had his power of attorney transferred over to Donald Blake, Madame Masque hired Ghost to kill Stark. She provided him a phone made by the Tinkerer, which he could use to execute his phase abilities to reach any place in the world. Ghost managed to track Stark to Broxton, Oklahoma, where he twice attempted to assassinate Stark. All the while, Stark's comrades were attempting to reboot his brain. By then, Stark had regained consciousness and used the Ghost's own phone against him, sending him to a facility in Seoul.

Thunderbolts post-"Siege"
For his help in the downfall of Norman Osborn, Ghost was recruited into  the new Thunderbolts team formed in the aftermath of the "Siege" storyline. Ghost is the first team member that Cage meets with as he arrives at the Raft. During the 2010 "Shadowland" storyline, he would witness Crossbones assassinate a police officer the Thunderbolts were meant to save. Ghost would also prove instrumental in the attempted Thunderbolt break out, but in doing so, managed to go to an alternate dimension, and he came face to face with Iron Man again.  In order to beat Ghost, Iron Man transmitted into Ghost's network a confirmation that all Stark Industries divisions were being shut down effective immediately. Ghost therefore resigned from plans to kill Stark, because he is no longer a tech monopolist. After coming back to The Raft, Ghost told Moonstone an unverifiable origin tale, whereupon he mused over whether that means he's regained his capacity to trust or whether he simply perceives her as no threat at all, only to conclude, as he phased through a speechless Moonstone, that both are irrelevant to a man who abandoned his humanity and is truly untouchable.

Ghost is later approached by Tiberius Stone and Mark Raxton, who hire him to sabotage Parker Industries, a competitor to Stone's own company Alchemax. Ghost infiltrates Parker Industries, and while he is subdued by Spider-Man and the company's employees, he still succeeds in destroying their building and everything in it with explosives.

Powers and abilities

The Ghost wears a battlesuit of his own design. Its Ghost-tech enables him to turn himself and any objects he touches invisible or intangible, but not both at the same time. Devices in the battle-suit enable him to hack and reprogram all manner of electronic systems in his vicinity as well as intercept, tamper with, or silence electromagnetic signals. This tech along with his superb intellect make him a super-hacker.

The Ghost also invented guns that fire bursts of electricity or concussive force blasts and employs a large arsenal of high-tech weaponry, including incendiary devices, self-targeting Anson grenades and sound-activated bombs. He often avoids direct confrontations altogether, preferring subterfuge and ambush tactics.

He is a brilliant tactician, inventor, and computer hacker.

Reception

Accolades 

 In 2018, CBR.com ranked Ghost 7th in their "Iron Man: His 20 Deadliest Villains" list.
 In 2022, Newsarama ranked Ghost 10th in their "Best Iron Man villains" list.

Other versions
The Ultimate Marvel version of Ghost is introduced in Ultimate Comics: Armor Wars #1, where he sneaks into one of Tony Stark's underground hideouts and steals an ornament from him. His armor has the traditional phasing capabilities, and he is also able to generate teleportation fields that allow him to warp objects away. He is later revealed to be working for "Project Tomorrow" under the Titanium Man. After Justine and Tony are kidnapped by Titanium Man's forces, who reveals himself to be Howard Stark Sr., he and all the other experiments except Tony are killed by an EMP that destroys all tech nearby. Very little is known about this Ghost, but according to Howard Stark Sr., "He got a funny accent."

In other media

Television
 Ghost makes a cameo appearance in the Iron Man episode "The Armor Wars, Part 1", voiced simultaneously by Jennifer Hale, Jamie Horton, and Tom Kane. He is hired by Justin Hammer to steal Iron Man's armor designs.
 Ghost appears in Iron Man: Armored Adventures, voiced by Michael Dobson. This version is an intelligent, charismatic mercenary who almost always accomplishes his objectives.
 Ghost appears in Avengers Assemble, voiced by Jim Cummings. This version is an Inhuman with phasing capabilities.
 Ghost appears in the Spider-Man episode "Stark Expo", voiced again by Jim Cummings. This version is a former Stark Industries employee.

Film
 Hannah John-Kamen portrays a female adaptation of Ghost named Ava Starr in the Marvel Cinematic Universe (MCU) film Ant-Man and the Wasp. She is the daughter of Elihas Starr, a former colleague of Hank Pym's who was killed during a failed attempt to build a portal to the Quantum Realm that also afflicted Ava with "quantum instability", which grants her her powers while also causing her chronic pain. With Bill Foster's help, she was recruited into S.H.I.E.L.D. as an assassin and given a suit meant to control her instability in exchange for a cure, but she and Foster went rogue after learning the organization had no intention of helping her. After coming into conflict with Pym, Hope van Dyne, and Scott Lang while attempting to steal energy from the Quantum Realm, Ava is stabilized by Janet van Dyne and goes into hiding with Foster once more.
 John-Kamen will reprise her role as Starr in the upcoming MCU film Thunderbolts.

Video games
 Ghost appears as a boss in the PSP and Wii versions of Iron Man 2, voiced by Steve Blum.
 Ghost appears in Marvel Heroes, voiced by Phil Buckman. He briefly works for Doctor Doom to help him steal the Tablet of Time before cutting ties with him. Ghost later aids the heroes by alerting them to Doom's plans as they prepare to storm Castle Doom.
 Ghost appears in Marvel: Avengers Alliance 2.
 A female incarnation of Ghost appears in Iron Man VR, voiced by Chantelle Barry. This version is an unnamed computer hacker who wears a suit that allows her to fly and phase through solid matter. After being orphaned as a child due to Stark Industries' weapons, she seeks revenge against Tony Stark. In pursuit of her goals, she comes into contact with Stark's rogue A.I., the Gunsmith, who manipulates her into pushing the company to produce weapons again in response to her attacks. After several battles, Ghost is defeated at her hideout and arrested. She later escapes and reluctantly joins forces with Stark to defeat the Gunsmith before disappearing.
 The MCU incarnation of Ghost appears as a playable character in Lego Marvel Super Heroes 2 via Marvel's Ant-Man and the Wasp DLC pack.

Miscellaneous
Ghost appears in the Spider-Woman motion comic, voiced by Jesse Falcon.

References

External links
 Ghost at Marvel.com

Characters created by Bob Layton
Characters created by David Michelinie
Comics characters introduced in 1987
Female characters in film
Fictional assassins in comics
Fictional businesspeople
Fictional characters who can turn intangible
Fictional characters who can turn invisible
Fictional engineers
Fictional inventors
Male characters in comics
Marvel Comics film characters
Marvel Comics scientists
Marvel Comics supervillains